Sir Johan Makeléer, 2nd Baronet or Johan Macklier (c. 1625 – c. 1696) was a member of the Maclean clan of Scotland in Sweden and a member of the Gothenburg Court of Justice from 1639 to 1696.

Biography
He was the son of Hans Makeléer, 1st Baronet and Anna Gubbertz. He married Anna Margareta Gordon and had two children: Sir Johan Jacob Makeléer, 3rd Baronet and Sir Gustav Makeléer, 4th Baronet. Gustav was the father of Sir Johan Gabriel Macklear, 5th Baronet who married Hedwig Rosenquist. Johan Makeléer, 2nd Baronet was later appointed to the Gothenburg Court of Justice.

References

Johan
Johan
Year of birth uncertain